Tourism Tasmania is the authority of the Government of Tasmania for dealing with tourism.

It has been a department name. In a number of governments, the Tasmanian Premier has also been Minister for Tourism.
 
It is regularly partners with the Tourism Industry Council of Tasmania in issues related to policies and plans.

Incorporation into larger department structures 

The Tasmanian Government Tourist Bureau had office in all the capital cities of the states of Australia before the second world war.

The department's last decade was the 1980s.

By July 1987 the Department of Tourism marketing changed from the Tasmanian Government Tourist Bureau to Tourism Tasmania.

In 1989 Tourism Tasmania had amalgamated with the Department of Sport and Recreation to become the Department of Tourism, Sport and Recreation.

In 1997 Tourism Tasmania was established as a statutory authority.

In August 2002 the Department of Environment, Parks, Heritage and the Arts(DTPHA) incorporated Tourism Tasmania.

Tourism Tasmania became a stand-alone State Authority from 1 July 2014

At various stage it has been also incorporated into other departments:

 Department of Primary Industries, Water and Environment (Tasmania)
 Department of Economic Development, Tourism and the Arts
 Department of State Growth (Tasmania)

The websites and materials available do not deal with corporate history or previous structures.

Notes 

Government agencies of Tasmania
Tourism in Tasmania
Tourism organisations in Australia